The Danger Girl is a 1916 American silent comedy film directed by Clarence G. Badger and starring Bobby Vernon and Gloria Swanson.

Plot
Reggie's sister disguises herself as a boy to prove to her brother and sweetheart that a vamp is only vamping them.

Cast
 Gloria Swanson as Reggie's madcap sister
 Bobby Vernon as Bobby, a young gentleman
 Helen Bray as Helen, the worldly woman
 Myrtle Lind as Bobby's former sweetheart
 Reggie Morris as Reggie aka Honey Boy
 A. Edward Sutherland as Last Season's Suitor

References

External links

The Danger Girl available for download at Internet Archive

1916 films
1916 comedy films
1916 short films
Silent American comedy films
American silent short films
American black-and-white films
Films directed by Clarence G. Badger
Films produced by Mack Sennett
Keystone Studios films
Articles containing video clips
American comedy short films
1910s American films